This is a list of ambassadors to Sweden. Note that some ambassadors are responsible for more than one country while others are directly accredited to Stockholm.

Current ambassadors to Stockholm

See also
 Foreign relations of Sweden
 List of diplomatic missions of Sweden
 List of diplomatic missions in Sweden

References
  Ministry for Foreign Affairs of Sweden - The Stockholm Diplomatic List
  Ministry for Foreign Affairs of Sweden - The Stockholm Diplomatic List. Including International Organisations and other Representations

 
Sweden